Louis-Joseph-Arthur Melanson (March 23, 1879 – October 23, 1941) was a Canadian priest and the first Archbishop of Moncton, New Brunswick.

Born in Trois-Rivières, Quebec, he was of Acadian descent on his father's side. Melanson moved to New Richmond, Quebec when he was little. Melanson studied theology in Rimouski and Montreal. He was ordained on July 9, 1905. He was consecrated Bishop of Gravelbourg, Saskatchewan in 1933 and became Archbishop of Moncton, New Brunswick in 1936.

References

External links
 Catholic-Hierarchy entry

1879 births
1941 deaths
20th-century Roman Catholic archbishops in Canada
People from Trois-Rivières
Roman Catholic archbishops of Moncton